Richard David Parks (born 14 August 1977) is a former Wales international rugby union player turned extreme endurance athlete and television presenter.

In rugby he represented Newport RFC, Pontypridd RFC, Celtic Warriors, Leeds Tykes, Perpignan and Newport Gwent Dragons over a professional career which spanned 13 years.  In May 2009 he was forced to retire from rugby due to a shoulder injury.

Early years 
Parks was born on 14 August 1977 in Pontypridd to a Jamaican mother, Lee, and a Welsh father, Derek Parks. Richard grew up in Newport, Wales and attended Rougemont School, Newport and Monmouth School.

Richard first started playing Rugby at the age of 11 at Rougemont School and progressed quickly through the school ranks playing at flanker throughout.

He was selected for Welsh Schools at under 18 level and then had a brief spell with Newport youth before spending a year in South Africa in 1996 at Michaelhouse, a boarding school for senior boys in Durban.  Richard competed for the first team at Michaelhouse whilst he studied A-level chemistry in order to gain entry to Cardiff University to study Dentistry.

Whilst in South Africa, Richard was invited to join the Natal Under 19s academy but this would have involved committing to attend university in South Africa.  Richard always had the desire to play for Wales, therefore he chose to return home to take a contract up with Newport Rugby Football Club, and sign his first professional contract as a rugby player.

Newport RFC 
In his first year at Newport RFC (1996–97) he was selected to play for the Welsh sevens team in Tokyo, Japan and in his second year at the age of 20 years, Richard was called up to train with the Welsh senior team.  At the end of this season (1997–98) Richard was voted most promising player of the year by his club winning the Arthur Boucher Award.

Park's 3rd season with Newport RFC saw him struck down with injury. He missed most of the season after suffering a stress fracture of his spine. Breaking his back resulted in Richard missing the opportunity to gain Welsh honours at an under 21 level.

After taking longer to recover than anticipated Richard was released from his contract at Newport RFC after 62 appearances and finished the season playing University Rugby for Cardiff Meds.

Pontypridd and playing for Wales 
Parks was subsequently signed by Pontypridd RFC for the following season, and in 2001 Parks represented the Welsh Sevens in the 2001 Rugby World Cup Sevens in Argentina.

Pontypridd won the Principality Cup in 2002 and reached the Parker Pen Shield final losing 22 – 25 to Sale Sharks.

Many of the Pontypridd squad, including Parks, were called up to represent Wales on a tour to South Africa. It was here on tour versus South Africa in Free State Stadium, Bloemfontein that 24-year-old Parks earned his first full international cap on 8 June 2002, in a 34–19 defeat, from the bench. He became the 1001st player to represent Wales.

During the next season Richard was selected for the autumn international series where he gained his second cap against Fiji.

A final season at Pontypridd continued and Parks remained in the Welsh squad.  He was named in the 6 Nations squad but did not feature on a match day.

During the summer of 2003, he was selected in the preliminary World Cup squad and played warm-up games against Scotland and Ireland. However, Parks missed out on final section to the World Cup in Australia.

Celtic Warriors 
Following the Introduction of regional rugby union teams in Wales in 2003, Parks was signed to the newly formed Celtic Warriors. He played the whole of that new look 2003–04 season out of position at number 8 due to injuries in the squad, finishing with 19 appearances.

Following the demise of the region after only one season, Parks joined the then Welsh head coach Phil Davies at Leeds Tykes.

Leeds and Perpignan 
After a difficult start to the 2004–05 season through injury, Parks become an influential member of the Leeds squad and was at times named as vice captain.

At the beginning of 2005 following injuries to key players, Leeds were bottom of the Zurich Premiership and some way adrift of their rivals. Despite the threat of relegation they made it to their first ever Powergen Cup final in 2005, defeating Bath 20–12 at Twickenham to claim their first ever trophy.

Following the cup win they went on to win five straight games and avoided relegation finishing the season in eighth position. The following season saw the Tykes lose their first eight games in three different competitions, and were relegated at the end of the season. Parks subsequently signed for USA Perpignan for the 2006–07 season. However, due to a failure to gain sufficient game time, Parks returned to Wales for the 2007–08 season with the Newport Gwent Dragons.

Newport Gwent Dragons 
Parks tore his knee ligaments in the Boxing Day derby against Cardiff Blues, marking the start of a long line of injuries, which ultimately led to his retirement from rugby. Early in his second season with the Dragons, Parks injured his shoulder in a tackle. Unaware of the severity of the injury, Richard continued to play and then had an operation over Christmas to repair his shoulder.  He returned to action at the beginning of the year but his shoulder problem reoccurred.  It was at this point, in May 2009 and after of trying many different courses of treatment to repair his shoulder, Richard was advised the damage to his shoulder was irreversible and following the second operation on his shoulder that year, he was advised he should not play rugby anymore.  He had made 30 appearances for the Dragons. Richard retired from rugby on 26 May 2009 aged 31.

737 Challenge and other expeditions
  
Following his retirement from rugby, Parks embarked on a challenge to climb the highest mountain on each of the world's 7 continents and complete the Three Poles Challenge within 7 months.

On 12 December 2010, Parks left Cardiff on the centenary of the departure of the ill-fated Terra Nova Expedition, led by Robert Falcon Scott, from that city. Parks was joined on parts of his 737 Challenge by Olympic rower Steve Williams and Marie Curie nurse Janet Suart.

He completed each leg of the 737 Challenge on the following dates:

 Leg 1: The South Pole – 27 December 2010, 6.10 am GMT
 Leg 2: Mount Vinson – 8 January 2011
 Leg 3: Aconcagua – 5 February 2011, 5.54 pm GMT
 Leg 4: Kilimanjaro – 27 February 2011, 4.57 am GMT
 Leg 5: Carstensz Pyramid – 15 March 2011, 11.28 pm GMT
 Leg 6: The North Pole – 11 April 2011, 2.20 pm BST
 Leg 7: Everest – 25 May 2011, 2.57 am BST
 Leg 8: Denali – 30 June 2011, 8.08 am BST
 Leg 9: Elbrus – 12 July 2011, 8.53 am BST

On 12 July 2011 he completed his challenge, finishing more than two weeks ahead of his self-imposed 7-month deadline.  He completed his 737 Challenge in a record setting 06 Months, 11 Days, 07 Hours and 53 Minutes and set a new benchmark in the climbing of the 7 summits.

His 737 Challenge raised hundreds of thousands of pounds in aid of Marie Curie Cancer Care whilst creating an advertising value worth £3 million to the cancer charity.

In December 2012, he attempted to ski solo and unsupported to the South Pole from Hercules Inlet on the Antarctic coast. During his trek he received an extra food resupply, and in January he had to abandon the attempt as he could not reach the South Pole in time for the last plane back to South America. He subsequently returned to Antarctica at the end of 2013, and on 4 January 2014 he completed an unsupported and unassisted journey to the South Pole, covering 1,150 km (715 miles) in 29 days, 19 hours and 24 minutes, the fastest solo for a Briton.

TV Documentaries 
Parks' 737 Challenge was filmed for a BBC Cymru Wales documentary; "Richard Parks – Conquering the World" and was transmitted in 3 parts from Tuesday 26 July 2011. It has since been distributed across the globe.  Filmed by Sports Media Services, the documentary showed the emotional and inspirational journey as he reached seven summits and three poles in seven months. A version has subsequently been released on iTunes.

In 2014, Park's first network television series was broadcast on Channel 5.  Filmed by Zig Zag Productions, it followed a year of preparation and then completion of endurance races, as well as skiing solo and unsupported to the South Pole.

2016 marked the production and release of a documentary series and a standalone documentary with Parks, both produced by One Tribe TV. A 3-part BBC One Wales and BBC Two series, "Extreme Wales with Richard Parks", was released in September. "Richard Parks on Everest", a 60-minute documentary for BBC One Wales following his progress earlier in the year on Project Everest Cynllun, was broadcast in October.

Honours and awards

2005 – One Powergen Cup/Anglo-Welsh Cup title
2012 – Won Just Giving Celebrity Fundraiser of the year.
2012 – Awarded the Rugby Writers' Club Special Award which was previously awarded to the likes of Phil Vickery, Sir Clive Woodward and Sir Ian McGeechan.
2012 – Awarded The 'Chancellors Medal' by the University of Glamorgan.
2012 – Awarded an Honorary Fellowship by the University of Wales.
2012 – Selected to carry the Olympic Torch.  
2012 – Named in the Business Insider's top 100 most influential people in Wales
2012 – Invited to meet the Queen at Buckingham Palace.
2012 – Alongside 737 Challenge design partner Limegreentangerine, won a national CIM Marketing Excellence Award, winning SME of the year at the 2012 CIM Marketing Excellence Awards.
2013 – Awarded an Honorary fellowship by Cardiff University.
2018 – Included in a list of 100 Brilliant, Black and Welsh people in Black History Month in the United Kingdom.

References

External links
Richard Parks
737 Challenge
Newport Gwent Dragons profile
Pontypridd RFC profile
Wales profile

1977 births
Wales international rugby union players
Welsh people of Jamaican descent
British sportspeople of Jamaican descent
Pontypridd RFC players
Newport RFC players
Leeds Tykes players
Dragons RFC players
British summiters of Mount Everest
Summiters of the Seven Summits
Black British sportsmen
Sportspeople from Pontypridd
Living people
Rugby union players from Pontypridd
Alumni of Michaelhouse